Caladenia fragrans, commonly known as the fragrant china orchid, is a plant in the orchid family Orchidaceae and is endemic to Western Australia. It is similar to the other china orchids, especially C. ashbyae but has a paler green leaf, vanilla-scented flowers and a more northerly distribution.

Description
Caladenia fragrans is a terrestrial, perennial, deciduous, herb with an underground tuber. On rare occasions the flower is white. The lateral sepals and petals have about the same dimensions as the dorsal sepal. There are many rows of small, bead-like calli covering the labellum. Flowering occurs from August to September.

Taxonomy and naming
The fragrant china orchid was first formally described in 2000 Stephen Hopper and Andrew Brown from a specimen collected near Paynes Find and the description was published in Lindleyana. In 2015, as a result of studies of molecular phylogenetics Mark Clements changed the name to Caladenia fragrans. The specific epithet (fragrans) is a Latin word meaning "smelling agreeably" referring to the rich fragrance of the flowers.

Distribution and habitat
The fragrant china orchid is found between Beacon and Mullewa in the Avon Wheatbelt, Murchison and Yalgoo biogeographic regions growing on and near low granite outcrops.

Conservation
Caladenia fragrans is classified as "Priority Three" by the Western Australian Government Department of Parks and Wildlife meaning that it is poorly known and known from only a few locations but is not under imminent threat.

References

fragrans
Endemic orchids of Australia
Orchids of Western Australia
Plants described in 2000
Endemic flora of Western Australia
Taxa named by Stephen Hopper
Taxa named by Andrew Phillip Brown